NGC 21 (also known as NGC 29) is a spiral galaxy in the Andromeda constellation. It was discovered by William Herschel in 1790. Lewis Swift observed it again in 1885, leading to its double listing in the New General Catalogue.

References

External links
 
 Wikisky image of NGC 29

Galaxies discovered in 1790
0021
Intermediate spiral galaxies
NGC 21
00100
000767
17901126